Copulabyssia tenuis  is a species of sea snail, a marine gastropod mollusk in the family Pseudococculinidae.

Description
The size of the shell varies between 0.7 mm and 2.6 mm.

Distribution
This marine species occurs in the Atlantic Ocean from the Faroes to Madeira; in the Mediterranean Sea.

References

External links
 
 Monterosato T. A. (di) (1880). Conchiglie della zona degli abissi. Bullettino della Società Malacologica Italiana,, Pisa, 6: 50–82
 effreys, J. G. (1883). On the Mollusca procured during the cruise of H. M. S. Triton, between the Hebrides and Faeroes in 1882. Proceedings of the Zoological Society of London. (1883)
 Appolloni, M.; Smriglio, C.; Amati, B.; Lugliè, L.; Nofroni, I.; Tringali, L. P.; Mariottini, P.; Oliverio, M. (2018). Catalogue of the primary types of marine molluscan taxa described by Tommaso Allery Di Maria, Marquis of Monterosato, deposited in the Museo Civico di Zoologia, Roma. Zootaxa. 4477(1): 1–138

Pseudococculinidae
Gastropods described in 1880